{{Infobox magazine
| image_file    = File:غلاف عدد مجلة نصف الدنيا.jpg
| image_size    = 
| image_caption = Nesf El Donyas 31st Anniversary Cover
| editor        = 
| editor_title  = 
| frequency     = Weekly
| circulation   = 
| category      = Women's magazinePolitical magazine
| company       = Al Ahram Publishing Group
| publisher     =
| founded       = 
| firstdate     = 
| finaldate     =
| country       = Egypt
| based         = Cairo
| language      = Arabic
| website       =
| issn          = 
| oclc          = }}Nesf El Donya''' (Half of the World), also known as Nesf El Donia, is an Arabic weekly women's and political magazine published in Cairo, Egypt. It has been in circulation since 1989.

History and profileNesf El Donya was first published in 1989. It is published by Al Ahram publication group, and its editors-in-chief are appointed by the Supreme Press Council which is a state-run body. The weekly is based in Cairo.

The magazine targets the working Egyptian women. It offers political news, and covers also articles about legal, religious, social affairs, focusing on their relation to women. The magazine includes a special section on female genital mutilation which features articles about its negative aspects. In addition, the weekly publishes interviews with significant female figures one of which was with Naglaa Ali Mahmoud, wife of Egypt’s former President Mohamed Morsi.

Afkar El Kharadly and Ali Al Sayed are the former editors-in-chief of the weekly. In June 2014, Amal Fawzi was appointed to the post. In September 2020 Marwa Mamdouh Anis Al Tobji was named as the editor-in-chief of the magazine.

The circulation of Nesf El Donya'' in 2000 was 350,000 copies.

See also
 List of magazines in Egypt

References

External links

1989 establishments in Egypt
Arabic-language magazines
Magazines established in 1989
Magazines published in Cairo
News magazines published in Africa
Political magazines published in Egypt
State media
Weekly magazines published in Egypt
Women's magazines published in Egypt